German submarine U-593 was a Type VIIC U-boat built for Nazi Germany's Kriegsmarine for service during World War II.
She was laid down on 17 December 1940 by Blohm & Voss in Hamburg as yard number 569, launched on 3 September 1941 and commissioned on 23 October under Kapitänleutnant Gerd Kelbling.

The boat's service began on 23 October 1941 with training as part of the 8th U-boat Flotilla. She was transferred to the 7th flotilla on 1 March 1942 and moved on to the 29th flotilla on 1 November.

Design
German Type VIIC submarines were preceded by the shorter Type VIIB submarines. U-593 had a displacement of  when at the surface and  while submerged. She had two shafts and two  propellers.

U-593 was fitted with five  torpedo tubes (four fitted at the bow and one at the stern), fourteen torpedoes, one  SK C/35 naval gun, 220 rounds, and a  C/30 anti-aircraft gun. The boat had a complement of between forty-four and sixty.

Service history
U-593 made 16 patrols between March 1942 and December 1943,  and sank 13 ships, for a total of 38,290 GRT and 2,954 tons. 
She made three patrols in the Atlantic from her base in Germany and from St Nazaire in occupied France, and sank three ships. She briefly clashed with British forces on their way to the St Nazaire Raid in March 1942. In October U-593 transferred to the Mediterranean and from various bases there made a further 13 patrols, sinking 8 merchant ships and 4 naval vessels, before being sunk in December 1943.

Fate
U-593 departed Toulon on 1 December 1943 for her 16th war patrol. On 12 December she intercepted convoy KMS 34, outbound from Gibraltar, off the coast of Algeria. Making an attack she hit the escorting destroyer , but was pursued by other escorts who engaged in a Swamp operation. In the afternoon of 13 December she was forced to the surface with depth charges and abandoned. All her crew escaped, and were picked up by the Allied ships.

Wolfpacks
In addition she took part in three wolfpacks, namely:
 Steinbrinck (3 – 11 August 1942)
 Lohs (11 – 17 August 1942)
 Tümmler (3 – 11 October 1942)

Summary of raiding history

See also
 Mediterranean U-boat Campaign (World War II)

References

Notes

Citations

Bibliography

Clay Blair (1998) Hitler's U-Boat War Vol II 

 
Paul Kemp  ( 1997) U-Boats Destroyed. 
Axel Niestle (1998) German U-Boat Losses during World War II.

External links

German Type VIIC submarines
U-boats commissioned in 1941
U-boats sunk in 1943
World War II submarines of Germany
World War II shipwrecks in the Mediterranean Sea
1941 ships
U-boats sunk by depth charges
U-boats sunk by British warships
U-boats sunk by US warships
Ships built in Hamburg
Maritime incidents in December 1943